Strmec nad Dobrno is a dispersed settlement in the Municipality of Dobrna in Slovenia. It lies on Paka Mount Kozjak north of Dobrna. The area is part of the traditional region of Styria. The municipality is now included in the Savinja Statistical Region.

The parish church in the settlement is dedicated to Saint Jodocus and belongs to the Roman Catholic Diocese of Celje. It was built between 1882 and 1884 on the site of a Gothic predecessor.

References

External links
Strmec nad Dobrno on Geopedia

Populated places in the Municipality of Dobrna